

cf-cg
CFDN
CG
CGP 57148B
CGP-42446

ch

cha-chi
Charcadole
Charcoaid
Charcocaps (W.F. Young, Inc.)
chaulmosulfone (INN)
Chealamide
Chemet (Lundbeck)
Chenix
chenodeoxycholic acid (INN)
Cheracol
Cheratussin DAC
CHG Scrub
Chibroxin (Merck)
chiniofon (INN)
ChiRhoStim (ChiRhoClin)
Chirocaine (Abbott Laboratories)

chl

chlo
Chlo-Amine Oral

chlor
Chlor-Pro Injection
Chlor-Rest Tablet
Chlor-Trimeton
Chlor-Tripolon

chlora-chlori
chloracyzine (INN)
Chlorafed Liquid
chloral hydrate (INN)
chloralodol (INN)
chloralose (INN)
chlorambucil (INN)
chloramphenicol (INN)
Chloraprep One-Step Frepp
Chlorate Oral
chlorazanil (INN)
chlorazodin (INN)
chlorbenzoxamine (INN)
chlorbetamide (INN)
chlorcyclizine (INN)
Chlordiazachel
chlordiazepoxide (INN)
chlordimorine (INN)
Chloresium
Chlorgest-HD Elixir
chlorhexidine (INN)
chlorisondamine chloride (INN)

chlorm-chloro
chlormadinone (INN)
chlormerodrin (197 Hg) (INN)
chlormerodrin (INN)
chlormethine (INN)
chlormezanone (INN)
chlormidazole (INN)
chlornaphazine (INN)
chlorobutanol (INN)
chlorocresol (INN)
Chlorofair
Chlorofon-A Tablet
Chloromag
Chloromycetin
Chloromyxin
chloroprednisone (INN)
chloroprocaine (INN)
Chloroptic-P S.O.P.
Chloroptic
chloropyramine (INN)
chloropyrilene (INN)
chloroquine (INN)
chloroserpidine (INN)
Chloroserpine
Chlorostat
chlorothiazide (INN)
chlorotrianisene (INN)
chloroxylenol (INN)

chlorp-chlorz
Chlorphed
chlorphenamine (INN)
chlorphenesin (INN)
chlorphenoctium amsonate (INN)
chlorphenoxamine (INN)
chlorphentermine (INN)
chlorproethazine (INN)
chlorproguanil (INN)
chlorpromazine (INN)
chlorpropamide (INN)
chlorprothixene (INN)
chlorquinaldol (INN)
Chlortab
chlortalidone (INN)
chlortetracycline (INN)
chlorthenoxazine (INN)
chlorzoxazone (INN)

cho-chy
Cholac
Cholan-HMB
Cholebrine
Choledyl
cholestyramine (INN)
Choletec
choline alfoscerate (INN)
choline fenofibrate (USAN, INN)
choline gluconate (INN)
choline salicylate (INN)
choline theophyllinate (INN)
Cholografin Meglumine
Cholografin Sodium
Cholovue
Choloxin
Cholybar
Chooz brandname chewing gum with calcium carbonate
Chorex
choriogonadotropin alfa (INN)
chorionic gonadotropin (INN)
Choron or Chron-10 brandname for chorionic gonadotropin
Chromalbin
Chromitope Sodium
chromocarb (INN)
Chronovera
Chronulac
Chymex
Chymodiactin
chymopapain (INN)
chymotrypsin (INN)